The Canfield-Moreno Estate is a historic residence and estate located in the Moreno Highlands neighborhood of Silver Lake, Los Angeles, California. It was designated as a Los Angeles Historic-Cultural Monument in 1988. Originally known as Crestmount, the estate also is called the Paramour Estate.

History
The mansion is a  Mediterranean Revival mansion on 4.5 acres. It was designed by architect Robert D. Farquhar and built in 1923. When it was the opulent residence of silent film star Antonio Moreno and his wife and oil heiress Daisy Canfield Moreno, daughter of pioneer oilman Charles A. Canfield, it was the scene for lavish Sunday afternoon parties for members of high society and silent screen notables.

On February 23, 1933, Daisy Canfield died of injuries she sustained in a car crash; her chauffeur-driven car plunged off Mulholland Drive while en route home from a party. Since then, the 22-room estate has seen many incarnations, including the Chloe P. Canfield School for Girls. In 1950, it became a convent for Franciscan nuns. In the 1970s, the Franciscan nuns ran a home for girls at the estate.

In 1999, the Shivaree band performed and recorded their first song Goodnight Moon in this place. However it is not a public fact but it is recognizable from the video of the song, more precisely in the pool. 

In 1998, the property was sold to restaurant owner Dana Hollister, who named it The Paramour Estate. In 1999, the finale of Scream 3 was filmed there. In 2021, Hollister listed it for $40 million.

In 2006, My Chemical Romance recorded their album The Black Parade there. Vocalist Gerard Way claimed to have night terrors while staying there, which he recorded his accounts of and used in the track Sleep. The band claimed the mansion was haunted.

The estate was used as the filming location for the music video of Sofia Carson's song "Glowin' Up", which was featured in the 2021 Netflix film, My Little Pony: A New Generation.

References

Los Angeles Historic-Cultural Monuments
History of Los Angeles
Houses in Los Angeles
Silver Lake, Los Angeles